Bernhard Meurl von Leombach (died 1526) was a Roman Catholic prelate who served as Auxiliary Bishop of Passau (1496–1526).

Biography
Bernhard Meurl von Leombach was born in 1452. On 4 May 1496, he was appointed during the papacy of Pope Alexander VI as Auxiliary Bishop of Passau and Titular Bishop cof Libariensis. He served as Auxiliary Bishop of Passau until his death on 27 Jan 1526. While bishop, he was the principal co-consecrator of Berthold Pürstinger, Bishop of Chiemsee (1508).

References 

15th-century Roman Catholic bishops in Bavaria
16th-century Roman Catholic bishops in Bavaria
Bishops appointed by Pope Alexander VI
1452 births
1526 deaths